Dominican Republic competed at the 2020 Summer Paralympics in Tokyo, Japan, from 24 August to 5 September 2021.

Disability classifications

Every participant at the Paralympics has their disability grouped into one of five disability categories; amputation, the condition may be congenital or sustained through injury or illness; cerebral palsy; wheelchair athletes, there is often overlap between this and other categories; visual impairment, including blindness; Les autres, any physical disability that does not fall strictly under one of the other categories, for example dwarfism or multiple sclerosis. Each Paralympic sport then has its own classifications, dependent upon the specific physical demands of competition. Events are given a code, made of numbers and letters, describing the type of event and classification of the athletes competing. Some sports, such as athletics, divide athletes by both the category and severity of their disabilities, other sports, for example swimming, group competitors from different categories together, the only separation being based on the severity of the disability.

Competitors

Athletics

Women 
Track

Powerlifting

Swimming

Men

Women

See also
Dominican Republic at the 2016 Summer Olympics

References

Nations at the 2020 Summer Paralympics
2020
2021 in Dominican Republic sport